Undertow Eyes (2009), original title Olhos de Ressaca, is a Brazilian short film.

Synopsis
Vera and Gabriel have been married for sixty years. In Undertow Eyes they wander about their own history: the first flirt, the birth of their children, life and aging. In this remembrance, images from their family collection mingle with images of the present, weaving an emotional and dreamlike universe. As a mosaic of stories and impressions, this short film looks like a personal and existential diary about love and death.

Film Credits
 Production Director: Petra Costa 
 Cinematography: Eryk Rocha, Petra Costa 
 Screenplay: Petra Costa 
 Direct sound: Edson Secco 
 Original score: Edson Secco 
 Producing company: Aruac Produções 
 Executive production: Petra Costa 
 Editing: Ava Rocha, Petra Costa

Cast

 Gabriel Andrade 
 Vera Andrade

Awards

References

External links
Undertow Eyes at IMDB

Brazilian short films
Films scored by Edson Secco